Keeran may refer to:

 Keeran (Tamil name)
 Keeran, a spelling variant of the Celtic name Ciarán
 Charles Rood Keeran (1883–1948), American inventor and businessman
 Roger Keeran (born 1944), American academic historian
 Keeran, County Fermanagh, a townland in Derryvullan, County Fermanagh, Northern Ireland

See also 
 Kiran (given name), an unrelated Indian given name
 Keeranur (disambiguation)